Terence "Terry" Neilson  (born November 2, 1958 in Toronto, Ontario) is a Canadian sailor. He won a bronze medal in the Finn Class at the 1984 Summer Olympics.

He skippered Canada II during the 1987 Louis Vuitton Cup.

References 
 

1956 births
Living people
Laser class world champions
Olympic bronze medalists for Canada
Olympic medalists in sailing
Olympic sailors of Canada
Canadian male sailors (sport)
Sailors at the 1984 Summer Olympics – Finn
Sportspeople from Toronto
Medalists at the 1984 Summer Olympics
1987 America's Cup sailors
World champions in sailing for Canada